The 2000 season of the Toppserien, the highest women's football (soccer) league in Norway, began on 29 April 2000 and ended on 21 October 2000.

18 games were played with 3 points given for wins and 1 for draws. Number nine and ten were relegated, while the two top teams from the 1. divisjon were promoted.

Trondheims-Ørn won the league.

League table

Top goalscorers
 24 goals:
  Kjersti Thun, Asker
  Ragnhild Gulbrandsen, Trondheims/Ørn
 20 goals:
  Marianne Pettersen, Athene Moss
 15 goals:
  Bente Musland, Bjørnar
 13 goals:
  Ingrid Camilla Fosse Sæthre, Bjørnar
  Ellinor Grønfur, Klepp
  Ann Kristin Aarønes, Trondheims-Ørn
 12 goals:
  Margunn Haugenes, Bjørnar
  Linda Ørmen, Kolbotn
  Ann Elisabeth Kallevik, Setskog/Høland
 11 goals:
  Linda Medalen, Asker
  Tonje Hansen, Kolbotn
 10 goals:
  Anita Rapp, Asker

Promotion and relegation
 Larvik and Grand Bodø were relegated to the 1. divisjon.
 Røa and Liungen were promoted from the 1. divisjon.

References
League table
Fixtures
Goalscorers

Toppserien seasons
Top level Norwegian women's football league seasons
1
Nor
Nor